William George Mount DL   (18 July 1824 – 14 January 1906) was a British landowner, Conservative politician, and the first Member of Parliament for the Newbury constituency.

He was educated at Eton College and Balliol College, Oxford.

The son of William Mount, of Wasing Place, Berkshire, he became a Magistrate in 1851, and High Sheriff in 1877. He was narrowly elected in the general election of 1885, beating his Liberal opponent by 202 votes. He was chairman of Quarter Sessions from 1887 to 1902, and was the first Chairman of Berkshire County Council from 1889 to 1906.

He served as MP for Newbury for 15 years until standing down at the 1900 general election.

He was the father of Sir William Mount, 1st Baronet, brother-in-law of Richard Fellowes Benyon, MP, of Englefield and great-great grandfather to David Cameron, who was Prime Minister of the United Kingdom from 2010 to 2016.

References

External links
 Portrait at Berkshire Record Office
 
 

1824 births
1906 deaths
People educated at Eton College
Alumni of Balliol College, Oxford
Members of Berkshire County Council
Conservative Party (UK) MPs for English constituencies
Newbury, Berkshire
People from Wasing
UK MPs 1885–1886
UK MPs 1886–1892
UK MPs 1892–1895
UK MPs 1895–1900
Deputy Lieutenants of Berkshire
High Sheriffs of Berkshire
William George